Kalavarda is a small town in the island of Rhodes, Greece with a population of about 502. It's about 28 kilometers from the island's capital, Rhodes, and about 52 Kilometers from the city Lindos.

References

Populated places in Rhodes (regional unit)